Inaam Dus Hazaar is a  1987 Bollywood action comedy film directed by Jyotin Goel. It stars Sanjay Dutt, Meenakshi Sheshadri in lead roles in their only film together. It is inspired by Alfred Hitchcock's classic North by Northwest. The film was the seventh highest grossing Hindi film of 1987.

Plot
Kamal Malhotra (Sanjay Dutt) is a salesman working with a table-fan manufacturing firm. He lives with his uncle and mother.
One night in a jewel exhibition, he meets the Nawab of Chandrapur (Raza Murad). While introducing himself to the Nawab, his name is overheard by a member of a gang, Kamran (Viju Khote). He is invited by Kamran to meet a diamond dealer, Seth Narottam Johri. The members of the gang are actually taking him to be the famous CID officer Kamal Malhotra. He is left drunk in a car and the police arrest him. He explains to the police what happened last night, but is unable to prove the identity of the gang.

Another night in a hotel, he finds Narottam Johri and tries to catch him. Narottam Johri is killed by another member of the gang, Luca (Gulshan Grover) and Kamal gets accused of the murder. He escapes from the hotel and tries to catch Luca, but the only thing he could get hold of is a train ticket. To save himself and to catch Luca, he flees from the police and travels by the same train in which Luca is travelling. There, he meets Sonia Shrivastav (Meenakshi Seshadri) and falls in love with her. To hide his identity, he introduces himself as Ashok Saxena to her.

In the train, the police come searching for him. So he escapes from the train taking Sonia as hostage in the police jeep. Sonia later tells Kamal that she is a model. Actually, she works for Captain S.P. Singh (Amrish Puri), whose gang is in search for CID officer Kamal Malhotra.

She makes the Captain understand in a meeting that she is trying to find the true identity of Kamal, while tricking him into thinking that she loves him. But the Captain realises that she cannot be trusted and asks Luca to kill her. However, Sonia makes a narrow escape and Luca is killed.

One night while Kamal is with the Nawab, he gets kidnapped by the Captain's men. However, he again manages to escape by getting himself caught by the police after creating chaos in an auction.

Towards the end, the Nawab organises an exhibition of his jewels, which Sonia is supposed to exhibit by wearing them. During the exhibition, Kamal is kept in a closed room as he watches the exhibition on a CCTV. The Captain disguises himself as the Nawab by wearing a mask.

At this point, it is revealed that it is actually Sonia who is the real CID officer Kamal Malhotra, and she is working with the Captain to take revenge for her brother, who was killed by Luca. Kamal Malhotra (Sanjay) now realises that Sonia (now also Kamal Malhotra) actually loves him and was doing all this for a good cause.

The story ends with the Captain's death after a chase sequence and finally, Kamal Malhotra (Sanjay) marries Sonia Shrivastav (Meenakshi).

Cast 

 Sanjay Dutt as Kamal Malhotra / Ashok Saxena
 Meenakshi Sheshadri as CID Inspector Kamal Malhotra / Sonia Shrivastav
 Raza Murad as Nawab Sahib
 Sharat Saxena as CID Inspector Indra
 Gulshan Grover as Lukka
 Amrish Puri as Captain S. P. Singh
 Shafi Inamdar as Karamat Khan ,Rickshaw Driver
 Satish Kaul as Vikram Malhotra
Kanan Kaushal as Savitri Malhotra
Jagdish Raj as Horse Auctioneer
Sudhir as Tony
Viju Khote as Kamran 
Ramesh Deo as Narottam Johri
Rajesh Puri  as Rickshaw Passenger
T.P.Jain as Veth Khanna

Soundtrack 
Lyrics: Majrooh Sultanpuri

External links 

 

1987 films
1980s Hindi-language films
Films scored by R. D. Burman
Indian remakes of American films